This is a list of Princes of Orléans, male line descendants of the House of Orléans, headed by the Duke of Orléans. The present House of Orléans was founded by Philippe de France, duc d'Orléans known as Monsieur and the only sibling of Louis XIV of France.

The children of Philippe de France held the rank of Grandchildren of France, being male line descendants of Louis XIII of France, the father of Louis XIV and Monsieur. This allowed that group of people the style of Royal Highness, this was from the reign of Louis XIII.

After 1723, member of the House of Orléans took the style of Serene Highness and thus ranked as Princes of the Blood. At the French court, these Princes outranked their cousins the Prince of Condé and the Princes of Conti, older branches of the House of Bourbon which ruled France from 1589 beginning with Henry IV till the end of the Revolution during the reign of Louis XVI.

The title Prince of Orléans, though not a de facto style has generally been restricted to the following persons:

the legitimate sons of a Duke of Orléans,
the legitimate male line descendants of a Duke of Orléans.

Princes of Orléans (1650–1652)

The following male was the son of Gaston, Duke of Orléans, the only surviving brother of Louis XIII. Gaston was created the Duke of Orléans at his first marriage in 1626 to the heiress Marie de Bourbon, Duchess of Montpensier; Marie died in childbirth while Gaston again married again in 1632 to Marguerite de Lorraine.

Princes of Orléans (1664–1850)

References and notes

See also
Prince d'Orléans

Dukes of Orléans
Princes of France (Bourbon)
House of Bourbon